Nikola Crnoglavac (born 22 April 1992) is a Serbian handball player for Romanian club CSM Bacău and the Serbia national team.

Career
Crnoglavac started out at Jugović in the Serbian Handball Super League. He later played abroad in Hungary (Tatabánya) and Romania (Dobrogea Sud Constanța and CSM Bacău).

A Serbia international since 2017, Crnoglavac participated in two European Championships (2018 and 2020).

References

External links
 EHF record
 MKSZ record

1992 births
Living people
Sportspeople from Kraljevo
Serbian male handball players
RK Jugović players
Expatriate handball players
Serbian expatriate sportspeople in Hungary
Serbian expatriate sportspeople in Romania